American Slang is the third studio album by New Jersey–based rock group the Gaslight Anthem. It was released on June 15, 2010, on SideOneDummy Records, which released their previous album, The '59 Sound. The album was produced by 'The '59 Sound producer Ted Hutt.

Writing and Recording
Lead singer and songwriter Brian Fallon stated in a New York City in-studio session, "All these songs came to me in my head. I didn't sit down at the guitar or piano or write lyrics, they all just were kind of there one day." Fallon said that American Slang would move away from the 1950s-inspired sound of The '59 Sound. He began writing for the new album in the summer of 2009 while on tour in support of The '59 Sound.
"American Slang is just what we do. That's who we are," Fallon said. "You’re presented with this American Dream and all these American possibilities—and then there's the reality of what actually happens with your life." In response to the obvious influences Tom Waits, The Clash, The Supremes, and most notably Bruce Springsteen had on their previous records, he went on to add, "This [record] is really the one where we said, ‘All right, well, we’ve got our influences. They’ll speak naturally, but what do we have to say on our own? What does it feel like to put on our own shoes and clothes? What do we sound like, and what's our story?’"

Release
The album was released on June 15, 2010, on SideOneDummy Records, the band's second release for the label. The album opened at No. 16 on the Billboard 200, making it the band's highest charting album at the time. It sold over 26,000 copies in its first week of release. It also debuted at No. 18 and No. 12 on the U.K. and Canadian charts, respectively.  
The band released the first single from the album, "American Slang", on their Facebook page on March 23, 2010, along with a full track list and cover art.

Reception

Uncut magazine (July 2010 issue) gave American Slang a 5-star rating and declared it its 'album of the month'. "American Slang delivers spectacularly on all expected fronts. Everything that was great about The '59 Sound is here, but the sound is even bigger, epic without getting blustery." Rock Sound magazine gave the album a 9/10 and also declared it its 'album of the month'.

In December 2010, Exclaim! named American Slang the No. 19 Pop & Rock Album of the year. Exclaim! writer Ben Conoley said, "American Slang is somehow your old man and your best friend all at once."

Big Cheese magazine (June 2010 issue) also gave the album 5 stars, saying that "The Gaslight Anthem have created the all-American album that travels by keeping its subject matter to that which everyone can relate to: the pain of a broken heart, salvation from the radio and love by the lights of the bar. The record is a perfect marriage of expert storytelling, superb musicianship and classic melodies."

Classic Rock magazine gave the album 8/10 and declared that "New and old fans alike will be speaking American Slang this summer."

The album reached the No. 3 position on the UK midweek album charts during its first week.

The album debuted at No. 16 on the Billboard 200, moving 27,000 copies, and was the No. 1 independent album for that week.

"Rolling Stone" magazine gave the album 3½ stars out of five, saying that "American Slang arrives with serious advance buzz: The choruses are more sculpted, but the band's tough-as-leather rush is as hard as ever, and Fallon howls so hard, he sounds like he's aiming to get a section of the Jersey Turnpike named after him."

"Rolling Stone" named the album's song "The Diamond Church Street Choir" at No. 39 on their list of 50 Best Songs Of 2010.

The album holds a Metascore of 80% on Metacritic, based on 28 professional reviews.

Track listing

Charts

Personnel
Band
 Brian Fallon – lead vocals, guitar
 Alex Rosamilia – guitar, backing vocals
 Alex Levine – bass guitar, backing vocals
 Benny Horowitz – drums, backing vocals

Additional backing vocalists
 Bryan Kienlin
 Pete Steinkopf
 Dave Franklin
 Ted Hutt
 Hollie Fallon
 Tom DuHamel
 Jesse Malin

Production
 Ted Hutt – record producer, mix engineer
 Ryan Mall – recording engineer, mix engineer
 Ted Young – assistant engineer
 Tom Baker – audio mastering
 Jeffrey Everett – design, layout, illustrations

References

The Gaslight Anthem albums
2010 albums
SideOneDummy Records albums
Albums produced by Ted Hutt